Muharem Trako (born 27 September 2003) is a Bosnian professional footballer who plays as a centre-back for Bosnian Premier League club Sarajevo.

References

External links

2003 births
Living people
Sportspeople from Zenica
Association football defenders
Bosnia and Herzegovina footballers
Bosnia and Herzegovina youth international footballers
FK Sarajevo players
Premier League of Bosnia and Herzegovina players